John of Capistrano (24 June 1386 – 23 October 1456) was a Franciscan friar and Catholic priest from the Italian town of Capestrano, Abruzzo. Famous as a preacher, theologian, and inquisitor, he earned himself the nickname “the Soldier Saint” when in 1456 at age 70 he led a crusade against the invading Ottoman Empire at the siege of Belgrade with the Hungarian military commander John Hunyadi.

Elevated to sainthood, he is the patron saint of jurists and military chaplains, as well as the namesake of the Franciscan missions  San Juan Capistrano in Southern California and San Juan Capistrano in San Antonio, Texas.

Early life
As was the custom of this time, John is denoted by the village of Capestrano, in the Diocese of Sulmona, in the Abruzzi region, Kingdom of Naples. His father had come to Italy with the Angevin court of Louis I of Anjou, titular King of Naples. He studied law at the University of Perugia.

In 1412, King Ladislaus of Naples appointed him Governor of Perugia, a tumultuous and resentful papal fief held by Ladislas as the pope's champion, in order to effectively establish public order. When war broke out between Perugia and the Malatestas in 1416, John was sent as ambassador to broker a peace, but Malatesta threw him in prison. It was during this imprisonment that he began to study theology. When he was released in he decided to give up the world and become a Franciscan friar, citing a dream where Saint Francis of Assisi ordered him to enter the Order. He had married before the war, but asserted the marriage was never consummated and received permission to take holy orders.

Friar and preacher
Together with James of the Marches, John entered the Order of Friars Minor at Perugia on 4 October 1416. Along with James, he studied theology at Fiesole, near Florence, under Bernardine of Siena. He soon gave himself up to the most rigorous asceticism, violently defending the ideal of strict observance and orthodoxy, following the example set by Bernardine. From 1420 onwards, he preached with great effect in numerous cities and eventually became well known. He was ordained in 1425.

Unlike most Italian preachers of repentance in the 15th century, John was effective in northern and central Europe—in German states of Holy Roman Empire, Bohemia, Moravia, Austria, Hungary, Croatia and the Kingdom of Poland. The largest churches could not hold the crowds, so he preached in the public squares—at Brescia in Italy, he preached to a crowd of 126,000.

Reformer

When he was not preaching, John was  writing tracts against heresy of every kind. This facet of his life is covered in great detail by his early biographers, Nicholas of Fara, Christopher of Varese and Girlamo of Udine. While he was thus evangelizing, he was actively engaged in assisting Bernardine of Siena in the reform of the Franciscan Order, largely in the interests of a more rigorous discipline in the Franciscan communities. Like Bernardine, he strongly emphasized devotion to the Holy Name of Jesus, and, together with Bernardine, was accused of heresy on this account. In 1429, these Observant friars were called to Rome to answer charges of heresy, and John was chosen by his companions to speak for them. They were both acquitted by the Commission of Cardinals appointed to judge the accusations.

He was frequently deployed to embassies by Popes Eugene IV and Nicholas V: in 1439, he was sent as legate to Milan and Burgundy, to oppose the claims of the Antipope Felix V; in 1446, he was on a mission to the King of France; in 1451 he went at the request of the emperor as Apostolic Nuncio to Austria. During the period of his nunciature, John visited all parts of the Empire.  As legate, or inquisitor, he prosecuted the last Fraticelli of Ferrara, the Jesuati of Venice, the Crypto-Jews of Sicily, Moldavia and Poland, and, above all, the Hussites of Germany, Hungary and Bohemia; his aim in the last case was to make talks impossible between the representatives of Rome and the Bohemians, for every attempt at conciliation seemed to him to be conniving at heresy.

He also worked for the reform of the Order of Friars Minor.  He upheld, in his writings, speeches and sermons, theories of papal supremacy rather than the theological wranglings of councils (see Conciliar Movement). John, together with his teacher, Bernardine, his colleague, James of the Marche, and Albert Berdini of Sarteano, are considered the four great pillars of the Observant reform among the Friars Minor.

Anti-Jewish incitement

John was known as the "Scourge of the Jews". Like some other Franciscans, he ranged over a broad area on both sides of the Alps, and his preaching to mass open-air congregations often led to pogroms. In 1450 the Franciscan "Jew-baiter" arranged a forced disputation at Rome with a certain Gamaliel called "Synagogæ Romanæ magister". Between 1451 and 1453, his fiery sermons against Jews persuaded  many southern German regions to expel their entire Jewish population, and in Silesia, then Kingdom of Bohemia, at Wroclaw many were burned at the stake.

The soldier saint

 

After the Fall of Constantinople in 1453, the Ottoman Empire, under Sultan Mehmed II, threatened Christian Europe. That following year Pope Callixtus III sent John, who was already aged seventy, to preach a Crusade against the invading Turks at the Imperial Diet of Frankfurt. Gaining little response in Bavaria and Austria, he decided to concentrate his efforts in Hungary. By July 1456 Capistrano managed to raise a large, albeit poorly trained force made up of peasants and local countryside landlords, with which he advanced towards Belgrade which was under siege by Turkish forces.. Though poorly equipped they were highly motivated. Capistrano and John Hunyadi traveled together, though commanding the army separately. Between them, they had gathered around 40,000–50,000 troops altogether. 

Hunyadi managed to break the naval blockade on the Danube, and breach the siege, bringing reinforcements and supplies to the city. By some accounts, the peasant soldiers started a spontaneous action, and forced Capistrano and Hunyadi to take advantage of it. Despite Hunyadi's orders to the defenders not to try to loot the Ottoman positions, some of the units crept out from demolished ramparts, took up positions across from the Ottoman line, and began harassing enemy soldiers. Ottoman Sipahis tried without success to disperse the harassing force. As more defenders joined those outside the wall. What began as an isolated incident quickly escalated into a full-scale battle.

John of Capistrano at first tried to order his men back inside the walls, but soon found himself surrounded by about 2,000 peasant levymen. He then began leading them toward the Ottoman rear across the Sava river. At the same time, Hunyadi started a desperate charge out of the fort to take the cannon positions in the Ottoman encampment. In the aftermath of a fierce battle, the Ottomans withdrew and retreated under cover of darkness; the siege was lifted. His involvement led to Capistrano being called “the Soldier Priest”. Although he survived the battle, John fell victim to the bubonic plague, which flourished in the unsanitary conditions prevailing among armies of the day. He died on 23 October 1456 at the nearby town of Ilok (now a Croatian border town on the Danube).

Sainthood and feast day
The year of John of Capistrano's canonization is variously given as 1690  by Pope Alexander VIII or as 1724 by Pope Benedict XIII. In 1890, his feast day was included for the first time in the General Roman Calendar and assigned to 28 March. In 1969, Pope Paul VI moved his feast day to 23 October, the day of his death. Where Mass and the Office are said according to the 1962 Roman Missal and its concomitant calendar, his feast day remains on March 28.

Eponym
As a Franciscan reformer preaching simplicity, John became the eponym of two Spanish missions founded by the Franciscan friars in the north of the then-Spanish Americas: Mission San Juan Capistrano in present-day Southern California and Mission San Juan Capistrano just outside the city center of present-day San Antonio in Texas.

Patron saint
He is the patron saint of military chaplains and jurists.

John of Capistrano in literature 
 Wilhelm von Scholz wrote a novel entitled "The Way to Ilok" ("Der Weg nach Ilok").

See also 
 Church of St. Wojciech, in Kraków, Poland, sermons
 Mission San Juan Capistrano in San Antonio, Texas
 Saint John of Capistrano, patron saint archive (March 28)
 Saint John of Capistrano, patron saint archive (October 23)

References

Further reading 

 
 

1386 births
1456 deaths
People from the Province of L'Aquila
University of Perugia alumni
Diplomats of the Holy See
14th-century Italian writers
15th-century Italian writers
Italian Friars Minor
Franciscan saints
Italian Roman Catholic saints
15th-century Christian saints
Canonizations by Pope Alexander VIII
15th-century deaths from plague (disease)